Pych is a surname. Notable people with this surname include:

 Mirosław Pych (born 1972), Polish Paralympic athlete
 Rick Pych, American sports executive

See also
 Pich

Polish-language surnames